Beach volleyball competitions at the 2023 Pan American Games in Santiago, Chile are scheduled to be held between October 21 and 27 at the Volleyball Sports Center, located in Cerrillos. a temporary venue in the San Miguel cluster.

Two medal events are scheduled to be contested. The events are: a men's and women's tournament. A total of 64 athletes (32 per gender and 16 teams per event) are scheduled to compete.

Qualification

A total of 64 Beach volleyball athletes will qualify to compete. Each nation may enter a maximum of 4 athletes (one team per gender of two athletes). As host nation, Chile automatically qualified a full team of four athletes (one team per gender). The best team per gender from NORCECA (North America, Central America and Caribbean) and CSV (South America) at the 2021 Junior Pan American Games also secured a quota. All other quotas were awarded through rankings (the three best teams per gender in the FIVB World Ranking, followed by five teams per gender from NORCECA and CSV.

Participating nations
A total of 4 countries qualified athletes so far. The number of athletes a nation entered is in parentheses beside the name of the country.

Medal summary

Medalists

References

Events at the 2023 Pan American Games
2023